Ole Budtz (born 20 April 1979, in Hillerød) is a Danish former professional footballer who played as a central defender. He played for Belgian club Cercle Brugge and for German side Kickers Offenbach. He has also played for Roskilde, AGF and Brabrand IF. He later moved to the Danish 1st Division with FC Roskilde from FC Fyn.

Budtz started his career as a forward. He was the top goal scorer for Cercle in the 2002–03 season, scoring 13 goals in 30 competition matches. He was converted to a defender while playing with Offenbach Kickers.

His twin brother, Jan Budtz, is a goalkeeper.

References

External links 

 Career stats at Danmarks Radio 
 

1979 births
Living people
People from Hillerød Municipality
Danish men's footballers
Cercle Brugge K.S.V. players
Kickers Offenbach players
Aarhus Gymnastikforening players
Notodden FK players
Belgian Pro League players
Danish Superliga players
Norwegian First Division players
2. Bundesliga players
Danish expatriate men's footballers
Expatriate footballers in Belgium
Expatriate footballers in Germany
Expatriate footballers in Norway
Association football central defenders
Association football forwards
Danish twins
Twin sportspeople
FC Roskilde players
Brabrand IF players
Association football defenders
Skovshoved IF players
Sportspeople from the Capital Region of Denmark